Linares Deportivo is a Spanish football team based in Linares, in the autonomous community of Andalusia. Founded in 2009 as a replacement for dissolved CD Linares, it plays in Primera Federación – Group 1. The team's stadium is Estadio Municipal de Linarejos, with a capacity of 10,000 seats.

History
Linares Deportivo was founded in 2009 under the name of Asociación Deportiva Linares, as a replacement for dissolved CD Linares. 

The club first reached the fourth division three years later, despite finishing second in the fifth level. In 2014–15, after winning its group, Linares defeated CD Castellón 3–0 on aggregate to win promotion to Segunda División B.

In doing so, Linares qualified for the first time to the Copa del Rey for the following season. They defeated FC Jumilla 2–1 at home in the first round on 2 September 2015, then lost by the same score at UD Logroñés. On 28 May 2017, the team dropped back to the fourth tier after a 2–1 aggregate loss to Burgos CF in the play-offs.

Club background
SG Linarense – (1909–20)
Linares FC – (1920–29)
Gimnástica Linarense – (1929–31)
Linares Deportivo (I) – (1940–46)
Atlético Linares – (1946–48)
CD Linares (I) – (1952–64)
Linares CF – (1961–90)
CD Linares (II) – (1990–2009)
Linares Deportivo – (2009–present)

Identity

Colors 
Linares Deportivo, like its predecessors, has always played with a blue shirt, white shorts and blue socks at home. The use of the blue color in the kit comes from linarite, a deep blue tabular crystalline mineral that was first identified in 1822 in the Linares mining district.

Badge 
Linares Deportivo's badge is in the shape of a rhombus cut in half and slightly convex outwards on the sides. It is divided diagonally by a red stripe with the name of the club. In the upper left part, in blue, is the interior of the city's coat of arms, in which the old fortress of Linares is represented. In the lower right part of white, there is a ball, representing the sporting character of the team.

Supporters 
Linares Deportivo's supporters are nicknamed azulillos (blues) or mineros (miners), due to the historical importance of lead mining for the development of the city of Linares.

Rivalry
Linares Deportivo's historic rival is Real Jaén, which currently plays in Tercera Federación.  The traditional rivalry between the cities of Jaén and Linares, which manifested itself between Real Jaén and the predecessors of Linares Deportivo, has been inherited by the new club. The historic rivalry between lagartos (lizards) and mineros (miners), nicknames of the teams from Jaén and Linares, respectively, has its origin in 1922. The matches between Real Jaén and Linares Deportivo are usually called "the Jaén classic", because they are played between the two most important and historic teams in the province of the same name. These matches are usually very popular, although also the cause of some brawl at times between fans of both teams.

Season to season

2 seasons in Primera Federación
3 seasons in Segunda División B
6 seasons in Tercera División

Honours
 Segunda División B (1): 2020–21
 Tercera División (2): 2014–15, 2019–20

Current squad
.

Reserve team

Notable players

References

External links
Official website 
La futbolteca team profile 

Football clubs in Andalusia
Association football clubs established in 2009
2009 establishments in Spain
Linares, Jaén
Primera Federación clubs